The Concord School House is a historic school building in rural Carroll County, Arkansas.  It is located on County Road 309, east of Eureka Springs.  It is a single-story wood-frame structure, built in 1886 to serve district 48 students.  It was used as a school until 1948, when the area schools were consolidated.  After a period of private use for storage, it was purchased by a local charity, moved to its present location, and restored.  It is used as an event facility.  It is one of two well-preserved one-room schoolhouses in the county.

The building was listed on the National Register of Historic Places in 2009.

See also
National Register of Historic Places listings in Carroll County, Arkansas

References

School buildings on the National Register of Historic Places in Arkansas
One-room schoolhouses in Arkansas
School buildings completed in 1886
Buildings and structures in Carroll County, Arkansas
National Register of Historic Places in Carroll County, Arkansas